Credit Union South, trading as NZCU South, is a New Zealand-based credit union that operates nationwide offering banking and financial services to its members. Operating as a not-for-profit organisation, NZCU South is one of New Zealand's longest running credit unions with its origins dating back to 1962 from St Mary's Catholic Parish in Nelson.  The legal entity of NZCU South was created in 2008 through the merger of numerous smaller credit unions in the Otago, Southland, Nelson, West Coast and Canterbury regions.

NZCU South is a New Zealand owned cooperative and operates independently under the NZCU brand. As of June 2018, NZCU South has over 19,000 members  and employs 91 employees  within their four branches, as well as in their support office which is located in Dunedin.

In April 2018, the credit union upgraded their banking system to a new modern one, Oracle Flexcube. They made this change in order to help with their shift into the digital environment. Being recognised as having the best contact centre within the financial and banking sector at the CRM Contact Centre awards in both 2014 & 2015.  NZCU South operates nationally across New Zealand with the organisational message of “backing New Zealanders who back themselves.”

On 13 March 2019  the members of Credit Union South voted in favour and passed a special resolution, approving a transfer of engagements of Credit Union South to Credit Union Baywide. Credit Union Baywide accepted this transfer of engagements on 15 March 2019, when their members and board of directors voted in favour of accepting the transfer of engagements from Credit union South and other participating New Zealand credit unions. The proposed merger of the participating credit unions, takes effect on 1 May 2019.

History

Establishment 

Established by the parishioners of St Mary's Catholic Parish in Nelson, 10 October 1962,  the New Zealand credit union movement swept the nation causing credit unions to pop up all around the country.

Colin Smith, a Hamilton chartered accountant, set about organising the New Zealand credit union league and in 1964. The league was established with nine member credit unions.

The credit union league traveled all over the country and spoke of the importance of the credit union movement. By the early 1980s New Zealand had several hundred credit unions.  This led to government intervention as regulations were then set in place to enforce increase capital reserves and liquidity levels. Meaning smaller credit unions were unable to compete, causing them to merge with larger credit unions.

NZCU South formation 

Credit Union Otago was formed in 1987 by the merger of five Otago based credit unions (CU); Fire services CU, Hospitals CU, Railways CU, Fletchers Hospital CU and Waterfront CU.

CU Otago sustained continued growth over its 20 years and in 2007, CU Otago merged with five more Dunedin based credit unions to become Credit Union Mainland.

CU Mainland grew quick and in 2008, further merged with credit unions operating in Southland, Westcoast, Canterbury and Nelson to form one major credit union for the South Island. It was during this merger that CU Mainland changed its legal name to Credit Union South and rebranded to NZCU South.

Banking system update 

On 2 April 2018, NZCU South went live with their new banking system, Oracle Flexcube. The banking system they were using before this was FACTS, which they adopted back in 1987 while under the name of CU Otago.

Transfer of engagements 
On 13 March 2019, the members of Credit Union South voted in favour and passed a special resolution, approving a transfer of engagements of Credit Union South to Credit Union Baywide. This transfer of engagements was part of a proposed multi-party credit union merger between Credit Union South and four other participating New Zealand credit unions; Aotearoa Credit Union, Credit Union Central, Credit Union Baywide and Credit Union Steelsands.

On 14 March 2019, Credit Union Steelsands members voted not in favour of the proposed transfer of engagements and have therefore, not gone ahead with the proposed merger with the participating credit unions.

On 15 March 2019, the members and the board of directors of Credit Union Baywide, accepted the transfer of engagements from three out of the four participating credit unions, meaning that they will merge to become New Zealand's largest credit union. The intended transfer of engagements will take effect from 1 May 2019, once certain regulatory approvals and conditions are met.

Core business activities

Transactional banking 

Transactional banking products and services include, everyday accounts, savings accounts, debit and credit cards, insurance and mobile banking.

Personal lending 

Personal lending products and services include personal loans and personal loan calculators.

Investment banking 

NZCU South offers term deposit options ranging from 1 month – 36 months. As well as the Fisher Funds KiwiSaver scheme.

Governance

Board of directors 

Chairman: Janice Fredric

Deputy chairman: Peter McKnight

Treasurer: Louise Edwards

Secretary: Peter Booth

Trustee: Steve Wakefield

Executive management 

Chief executive officer: Tania Dickie

Chief financial officer: Tim Wren

General manager, technology: Eddie Steven

Awards 
Winners in the banking/financial sector at the CRM Contact Centre awards for both 2016 and 2015.

Winner of the Web/Email Customer Service in all industries at the CRM Contact Centre awards for both 2016 and 2015.

Recipient of the CANSTAR Innovation Award, 2012.

Corporate social responsibility 

NZCU South is a premier sponsor of Sydenham Rugby club located in Christchurch.

NZCU South offers a scholarship programme for young members.

External links 
 Website

References 

Credit unions of New Zealand